Paralaudakia erythrogaster, the redbelly rock agama,  is an agamid lizard found in Iran, Afghanistan, and Turkmenistan.

References

Paralaudakia
Reptiles of Central Asia
Reptiles described in 1896
Taxa named by Alexander Nikolsky